The 1932 USC Trojans football team is an American football team that represented the University of Southern California (USC) in the Pacific Coast Conference (PCC) during the 1932 college football season.  In its eighth season under head coach Howard Jones, the team compiled a perfect 10–0 record (6–0 against conference opponents), won the PCC championship, shut out eight of ten opponents, defeated Pittsburgh in the 1933 Rose Bowl, and outscored all opponents by a total of 201 to 13.

Although there was no AP Poll to determine a national champion in 1932, the Knute K. Rockne Trophy was presented at the end of the season to the team deemed to be the national champion using the Dickinson System, a rating system developed by Frank G. Dickinson, a professor of economics of the University of Illinois.  Michigan won the Rockne Trophy, edging USC by a margin of 28.47 to 26.81. However, USC was later recognized as the 1932 national champion in several retrospective rankings, including Berryman, Billingsley, Boand, Dunkel, College Football Researchers Association, Helms, Houlgate, National Championship Foundation, Poling, and Williamson.

Tackle Ernie Smith was a consensus first-team pick for the 1932 All-America team. Guard Aaron Rosenberg was also selected as a first-team All-American by the Football Writers Association of America and Liberty magazine. Six USC players were selected as first-team players on the 1932 All-Pacific Coast football team: Ernie Smith (AP-1; NEA-1; UP-1); Rosenberg (AP-1; NEA-1); Tay Brown at tackle (AP-1; NEA-1; UP-1); Orville Mohler at quarterback (NEA-1; UP-1); Homer Griffith at quarterback (AP-1); and Ray Sparling at end (NEA-1).

Schedule

References

USC
USC Trojans football seasons
College football national champions
Pac-12 Conference football champion seasons
Rose Bowl champion seasons
College football undefeated seasons
USC Trojans football